A comprehensive economic partnership agreement (CEPA) is a free trade agreement between two countries

Some CEPA 
 Armenia-EU Comprehensive and Enhanced Partnership Agreement
 Comprehensive Economic Partnership Agreement between India and South Korea
 Comprehensive Economic Partnership for East Asia
 Regional Comprehensive Economic Partnership
 Comprehensive Economic Partnership Agreement between Indonesia and the European Union (in negotiations)
 Indonesia–Australia Comprehensive Economic Partnership Agreement

Similar 

 Comprehensive Economic Cooperation Agreement
 India–Singapore Comprehensive Economic Cooperation Agreement

See also 
 Free-trade area

Free trade agreements